Al-Kashkari (322 in AH/c. 934 CE in Kashkar – 414 AH/1023 CE in Fushanj) was a hospital physician from Baghdad.

In diagnosing mental disorder, al-Kashkari used criteria such the temperament of the patient as indicators to ascertain the nature of the mental disorder: sluggishness and forgetfulness point to a cold temperament, which requires a different treatment from a warm one, which is revealed through insomnia.

References

Further reading
 

930s births
1023 deaths
10th-century physicians
10th-century people from the Abbasid Caliphate
Physicians of the medieval Islamic world